is a Japanese sports manga series written and illustrated by Tetsuya Chiba about sumo wrestling.

Plot
Matsutarou Sakaguchi is lazy and quick tempered. As a result, he is stuck in middle school even though he is an adult. One day he gets in a fight with a sumo wrestler and they take the fight to a sumo ring. The attending sumo stable masters are impressed by Sakaguchi's strength and convince Sakaguchi to come to Tokyo. Sakaguchi has an ulterior motive though. A teacher he has a crush on, Reiko Minami recently moved to Tokyo and the sumo stable is close to her home. Sakaguchi begins training and competing in sumo while dreaming of the day he can marry Reiko.

Publication
Notari Matsutarō was serialized by Shogakukan in Big Comic magazine from August 1973 to June 1993, then after a hiatus it returned from October 1995 to March 1998. From 1995 to 1998, Tarō Nami was also responsible for the storyboard of the series. The complete series was originally encapsulated into 36 tankōbon volumes by Shogakukan between March 1976 and March 2000. It has been republished twice; 8 volumes were released between 1988 and 1991, and 22 volumes were published in 2003–2004.

Adaptations
It was adapted as a series of ten original video animations (OVA) released between November 22, 1990 and April 25, 1991. It was directed by Yoshio Takeuchi and its ending theme, was performed by Ikuzo Yoshi.

A television series titled , with lead character Matsutarō Sakuguchi voiced by Ken Matsudaira, began broadcast on TV Asahi affiliates on April 6, 2014. It was also streamed on Crunchyroll for, among others, English-language countries United States, Canada, South Africa, Australia, New Zealand, and United Kingdom. Yukio Kaizawa directed the series that was produced by Tomohiro Tsuji from TV Asahi and Gyarmath Bogdan from Toei Animation.

Reception
Notari Matsutaro received the 1978 Shogakukan Manga Award for seinen/general manga. Katsuhiro Otomo cited the pacing of Notari Matsutarō as an influence, particularly on his series Domu.

See also
 Aah! Harimanada
 Salaryman Kintaro

References

External links
 
 
 

1973 manga
1990 anime OVAs
2014 anime television series debuts
Seinen manga
Shogakukan franchises
Shogakukan manga
Sumo anime and manga
Sumo mass media
Winners of the Shogakukan Manga Award for general manga
Toei Animation television